The Topla is a right tributary of the river Bunea in Romania. It flows into the Bunea near Remetea-Luncă.

References

Rivers of Romania
Rivers of Timiș County